Cīrava Parish is an administrative unit of South Kurzeme Municipality, Latvia.  The parish has a population of 1285 (as of 1/07/2010) and covers an area of 131.6 km2.

Villages of Cīrava parish 
 Akmene
 Cīrava
 Dzērve (Dzērves skola)
 Dzērvenieki
 Marijas

See also 
 Cīrava Palace
 Dzērve Manor

External links 
 Cīrava parish in Latvian

Parishes of Latvia
South Kurzeme Municipality
Courland